Oblivion Song is an American comic book series created by writer Robert Kirkman and artist Lorenzo de Felici.

It is a supernatural science fiction story that chronicles Nathan Cole, a man who makes daily trips to try to rescue those still living in the apocalyptic hellscape of Oblivion, a part of Philadelphia lost a decade ago along with 300,000 of its citizens.

The first issue of the monthly comic was published in March 2018 by Image Comics.

In February 2021, it was announced that the series will end with issue #36.

Film adaptation
In June 2019, it was revealed that Universal Pictures and Skybound Entertainment will produce an Oblivion Song movie with Sean O’Keefe writing the script. In August 2021, it was announced that Jake Gyllenhaal will star in and produce the film under his Nine Stories Productions banner.

Collected editions

References

External links 
 
 Oblivion Song page at Image Comics

Skybound Entertainment titles